Jon Øyvind Odland (born 29 May 1954) is a Norwegian politician for the Centre Party.

He served as a deputy representative to the Parliament of Norway from Nordland during the term 2005–2009 and 2009–2013. In total he met during 106 days of parliamentary session.

References

1954 births
Living people
Centre Party (Norway) politicians
Deputy members of the Storting
Nordland politicians
Place of birth missing (living people)
21st-century Norwegian politicians